The neck-banded blenny (Leptostichaeus pumilus) is a species of marine ray-finned fish belonging to the family Eulophiidae, the spinous eelpouts. it is the only species in the monotypic genus Leptostichaeus. This fish is found in the northwestern Pacific Ocean.

References

Fish described in 1985
Eulophiidae